The Suðuroyartunnilin (Suðuroy Tunnel) is a proposed submerged fixed-link in the Faroe Islands, linking the island of Suðuroy to Sandoy. Currently all vehicles and cargo, and virtually all passenger traffic must use the ferry service.

Current situation
At present, a ferry service operates between Krambatangi on central Suðuroy and the capital Tórshavn. The ferry is operated by the national transport company Strandfaraskip Landsins and uses the vessels Smyril (passengers and cargo) and Herhjólfur III (cargo), taking two hours and five minutes (Smyril) to three hours (Herhjólfur III) each way. In 2019, on average 1,000 passengers (including the drivers) and 290 vehicles embarked on the ferry per day. The frequency is either twice or three times per day, though the service is frequently cancelled in winter due to adverse weather and heavy seas, since the Suðuroyarfjørður strait is exposed to swell and strong tidal currents (with overfalls in places), and funnels northwesterlies.

Currently another ferry links Skúvoy and Sandoy multiple trips per day, most of which need to be reserved in advance. If the Suðuroyartunnilin would route via Skúvoy, it would add Skúvoy to the road network and replace this passenger ferry service as well. Incidentally, the Suðuroyartunnilin would form a structural, direct link between Sandoy and Suðuroy - the two southern sýslur (districts) - for the first time in decades. Currently they are only marginally linked via a twice-weekly helicopter service, running the route Tórshavn-Skúvoy-Stóra Dímun-Froðba, which does not call at Sandoy itself.

Landsverk constructed a new Hvalbiartunnil between Trongisvágur and Hvalba. This tunnel replaced the old tunnel from 1963. The old Hvalbiartunnilin was a bottleneck that needed to be solved for before Suðuroyartunnilin could become a reality. Also a replacement of the Sanvíkartunnilin, to the northernmost village Sandvík, is being considered for this reason. A new tunnel of 2.5 kilometres has an estimated cost of 219 million DKK.

On Sandoy, the Sandoyartunnilin will open in December 2023 and connect Sandoy to Streymoy. This tunnel would act as a stepping stone for Suðuroy-bound traffic if the Suðuroyartunnilin becomes reality. In the meantime, the ferry MS Smyril may dock in Sandur instead of Tórshavn, and sail to Hvalba, as was expressed as a possibility by Strandfaraskip Landsins in 2023. This would reduce the crossing time to 1 hour and 15 minutes, thus allowing for increased frequency, and bringing travel times from Suðuroy to Tórshavn to a maximum of 2.5 hours from door to door. However, the ports in Hvalba and Sandur would need to be extended in order to accommodate MS Smyril.

Project
The calls for a fixed link to Suðuroy emerged after the success of the two earliest sub-sea tunnels in the Faroe Islands, the Vágatunnilin and Norðoyatunnilin in 2002 and 2006 respectively. The Suðuroyartunnilin was first referred to officially in the National Transport Plan for 2008-2020, stating no concrete ambitions. The project was given more attention in the National Transport Plan 2012-2024, estimating an investment of 8 million DKK for a 22.5 km tunnel from Dalur to Sandvík, but again without concrete ambitions. The idea has gained more public attention since the onset of the construction of the Eysturoyartunnilin (opened in December 2020) and Sandoyartunnilin (to open in December 2023). 

The National Transport Plan for 2018-2030 lists the Suðuroyartunnilin again as an opportunity but no concrete plans to construct it. It recommends building the link in two sections, first from Sandoy to Skúvoy as a tunnel, bridge or causeway, and then onward to Suðuroy. It expected the costs to range from 2.8 to 3.4 million DKK, with an opening date of no earlier than 2030. The plan suggests a projected ridership of circa 1,000 vehicles per day in 2030. In 2019, Landsverk estimated ridership to be 800 motor vehicles per direction per day in 2030. 

In October 2021, public works authority Landsverk published a preliminary cost–benefit analysis scenario study that calculated the net present value for four tunnel options and two ferry options. This report was later published in English as Removing the Island Barrier. The expected ridership was now between 1,050 and 1,300 vehicles per day per direction, depending on the toll levels. The scenario study lists the following options: 

The total investment cost of a tunnel, excluding connecting roads would range from 3.6 to 5.4 billion DKK, corresponding roughly to one-quarter of the Faroese gross national income. At most 10% of the total costs could be recovered via tolls. Projected daily ridership for both directions combined ranges from 1,060 (option 5) to 1,370 motor vehicles per day (option 3).Parameters included in the analysis were operational costs, write-off (ferry Smyril), substitution effects, user prices (tolls or ferry tickets), demographic effects, employment effects, inflation and increase of wages, carbon dioxide emissions (during construction and operation) and the volume of debris generated in tunnel construction. As for option 5, the cost-benefit analysis did not consider the move of Suðuroy's ferry terminal northwards to Hvalba, which would further reduce the distance to 29.6 kilometres. It would, however, add 11 kilometers by road from Krambatangi.

In November 2022, the Faroese government agreed to go ahead with the project by establishing a public company to draft tunnel designs and precise routings. The results are to be expected in autumn 2024. Only after this, a final decision for the project can be expected. In the meantime, the government will put up the business plan and the sustainability assessment. In January 2023, the minister of Fisheries and Transport Dennis Holm suggested that drilling could already start within two years. However, public company enterprises are part of the Prime Minister's responsibility, who referred to the coalition agreement, which does not state a start and end date.

See also
 List of tunnels of the Faroe Islands

References 

Tunnels in the Faroe Islands
Proposed tunnels in Denmark
Proposed undersea tunnels in Europe